Aaron Craig Fuller (born December 3, 1989) is an American professional basketball player for Urunday Universitario of the Liga Uruguaya de Básquetbol (LUB) in Uruguay. He played college basketball for the University of Iowa and the University of Southern California before playing professionally in Portugal, New Zealand, Mexico, the Philippines, Luxembourg, Israel, and Uruguay.

High school career
Fuller attended Mesa High School in Mesa, Arizona, where he earned all-state and all-conference honors as a junior and senior. As a senior in 2007–08, he averaged 24.5 points, 10.8 rebounds and 2.1 blocked shots per game, as he led Mesa to a 17–11 record and an East Valley Region championship. He was named East Valley Region Player of the Year and East Valley Tribune Player of the Year, and was named Player of the Year for Class 4A-5A in Arizona by the Arizona Republic.

College career

As a freshman for Iowa in 2008–09, Fuller appeared in 32 games with 19 starts, while averaging 4.0 points and 2.7 points per game. He scored a season-high 16 points against Penn State on January 24.

As a sophomore in 2009–10, Fuller earned All-Big Ten Honorable Mention honors after averaging 9.7 points and a team-leading 6.2 rebounds in 30 games (22 starts). He posted a team-best six double-doubles and led Iowa in rebounding a team-best 14 times, including 12 of the last 16 games. On February 16, he recorded career-highs of 30 points and 13 rebounds against Michigan.

On April 9, 2010, Fuller announced his decision to leave the Hawkeyes basketball program in order to move closer to home and his family. Less than a month later, on May 4, he signed with USC and subsequently redshirted the 2010–11 season due to NCAA transfer regulations.

As a redshirted junior in 2011–12, Fuller suffered a labral tear in his left (shooting) shoulder in October, and in December he suffered one in his right shoulder. He was later ruled out for the rest of the season in January due to the injuries, opting to have season-ending surgery to deal with the labrum tear in his left shoulder. Shooting with his non-preferred right hand for most of the season, he was second on the Trojans team in scoring (10.6) and first in rebounding (5.9).

As a senior in 2012–13, Fuller's role was dramatically reduced as he started just six games and averaged 14.7 minutes per game. He scored a season-high 15 points against UCLA and finished the season with averages of 4.1 points and 3.6 rebounds in 32 games. At the Trojans' annual awards banquet on April 9, he received the John Rudometkin Award for giving 110% effort throughout the season.

College statistics

|-
| style="text-align:left;"| 2008–09
| style="text-align:left;"| Iowa
| 32 || 19 || 17.2 || .364 || .297 || .440 || 2.7 || .4 || .4 || .3 || 4.0
|-
| style="text-align:left;"| 2009–10
| style="text-align:left;"| Iowa
| 30 || 22 || 24.4 || .477 || .200 || .676 || 6.2 || .7 || .4 || .3 || 9.7
|-
| style="text-align:left;"| 2011–12
| style="text-align:left;"| USC
| 18 || 18 || 29.2 || .515 || .000 || .631 || 5.9 || .4 || .9 || .4 || 10.6
|-
| style="text-align:left;"| 2012–13
| style="text-align:left;"| USC
| 32 || 6 || 14.7 || .505 || .000 || .667 || 3.6 || .2 || .4 || .3 || 4.1
|-
| style="text-align:center;" colspan="2"|Career
| 112 || 65 || 20.3 || .465 || .269 || .636 || 4.4 || .4 || .5 || .3 || 6.6
|-

Professional career

U.D. Oliveirense (2013–2014)
On September 20, 2013, Fuller signed with U.D. Oliveirense of Portugal for the 2013–14 LPB season. He appeared in all 20 games for Oliveirense in 2013–14, averaging 18.2 points, 9.7 rebounds, 1.1 assists and 1.3 steals per game.

Taranaki Mountainairs (2015)
In January 2015, Fuller signed with the Taranaki Mountainairs for the 2015 New Zealand NBL season. On April 14, he was named co-Player of the Week for Round 2 alongside Southland Sharks forward Tai Wesley. In the Mountainairs' final game of the season on June 28 against the Super City Rangers, Fuller set an NBL record for points scored in a game with 54 on 25-of-34 shooting. He also recorded a season-high 19 rebounds in a two-point loss to the Rangers, and subsequently earned Round 13 Player of the Week honors. In 18 games for Taranaki, he averaged a league-leading 28.4 points, 9.5 rebounds and 1.3 steals per game, and earned All-Star Five honors. Despite his great season, the Mountainairs failed to win a game in what was just the fourth winless season for an NBL team in league history.

Fuerza Regia (2015–2017)
On September 22, 2015, Fuller signed with Fuerza Regia of Mexico for the 2015–16 LNBP season. On November 26, he had a season-best game with 22 points and 7 rebounds in a loss to Soles de Mexicali. He later scored 19 points against Abejas de Guanajuato on January 17, and had an 18-point game on February 11 against Panteras de Aguascalientes. In 35 games for Fuerza, he averaged 6.0 points and 3.0 rebounds per game.

In August 2016, Fuller re-signed with Fuerza Regia for the 2016–17 season. In 25 games, he averaged 3.6 points and 2.2 rebounds per game.

NLEX Road Warriors (2017)
On May 19, 2017, Fuller signed with the NLEX Road Warriors as an import for the 2017 PBA Governors' Cup. In 11 games for the Road Warriors, he averaged 22.6 points, 17.7 rebounds, 1.5 assists, 1.6 steals and 1.5 blocks per game.

Racing (2018)
In January 2018, Fuller joined Luxembourgian club Racing of the Total League. In 10 games, he averaged 30.0 points, 14.4 rebounds, 1.3 assists, 1.0 steals and 1.2 blocks per game.

Return to NLEX Road Warriors (2018)
In August 2018, Fuller re-joined the NLEX Road Warriors for the 2018 PBA Governors' Cup as an injury replacement for Olu Ashaolu.

Hapoel Galil Elyon (2018–2019)
On November 29, 2018, Fuller signed with the Israeli team Hapoel Galil Elyon of the Liga Leumit, replacing Stephen Maxwell. In 8 games played for Galil Elyon, he averaged 13.9 points, 5.3 rebounds and 1.5 steals per game.

Soles de Mexicali (2019)
On January 22, 2019, Fuller signed with Mexican team Soles de Mexicali for the Liga Americas. In three games, he averaged 6.7 points, 4.0 rebounds and 1.0 assists per game.

Return to Fuerza Regia (2019)
In February 2019, Fuller re-joined Fuerza Regia for the rest of the LNBP season. In 18 games, he averaged 6.7 points, 3.8 rebounds and 1.2 assists per game.

Blackwater Elite (2019)
In August 2019, Fuller joined Blackwater Elite of the Philippine Basketball Association for the East Asia Super League Terrific 12 and the PBA Governors' Cup. He was replaced by Marqus Blakely for the Terrific 12 tournament due to an ankle injury. He made his debut for the team in the Governors' Cup, but was later replaced again by Blakely due to not being 100%.

Fuerza Regia and Malvín (2019–2021)
Between November 2019 and November 2020, Fuller played for Fuerza Regia in the LNBP.

In March 2021, Fuller joined Malvín of the Liga Uruguaya de Básquetbol.

Between September and November 2021, Fuller once again played for Fuerza Regia.

TNT Tropang Giga (2021–2022)
On December 25, 2021, Fuller joined the TNT Tropang Giga for the 2021 PBA Governors' Cup as a replacement for the injured McKenzie Moore. He was released in March 2022 after sustaining a calf injury. He averaged 17.4 points, 16.4 rebounds, 2.2 assists, and 2.6 blocks per contest.

Seventh season with Fuerza Regia (2022)
In July 2022, Fuller re-joined Fuerza Regia for a seventh season.

Urunday Universitario (2023–present)
In February 2023, Fuller joined Urunday Universitario of the Liga Uruguaya de Básquetbol (LUB).

References

External links

Iowa bio
USC bio
Q + A With Aaron Fuller

1989 births
Living people
American expatriate basketball people in Israel
American expatriate basketball people in Luxembourg
American expatriate basketball people in Mexico
American expatriate basketball people in New Zealand
American expatriate basketball people in the Philippines
American expatriate basketball people in Portugal
American expatriate basketball people in Uruguay
American men's basketball players
Basketball players from Arizona
Blackwater Bossing players
Club Malvín basketball players
Fuerza Regia de Monterrey players
Hapoel Galil Elyon players
Iowa Hawkeyes men's basketball players
Mesa High School alumni
NLEX Road Warriors players
Philippine Basketball Association imports
Power forwards (basketball)
Small forwards
Soles de Mexicali players
Sportspeople from Mesa, Arizona
Taranaki Mountainairs players
TNT Tropang Giga players
USC Trojans men's basketball players